Luzonichthys is a genus of marine ray-finned fish in subfamily Anthiinae of the family Serranidae, the groupers and sea basses.

Species
There are currently 8 recognized species in this genus:
 Luzonichthys earlei J. E. Randall, 1981 (Earle's splitfin)
 Luzonichthys kiomeamea Shepherd, Pinheiro, Phelps, Perez-Matus & Rocha, 2019 (Easter Island splitfin)
 Luzonichthys microlepis (J. L. B. Smith, 1955) (Slender splitfin) 
 Luzonichthys seaver Copus, Ka'apu-Lyons & Pyle, 2015 (Seaver splitfin) 
 Luzonichthys taeniatus J. E. Randall & J. E. McCosker, 1992 (Striped splitfin)
 Luzonichthys waitei (Fowler, 1931) (Waite's splitfin)
 Luzonichthys whitleyi (J. L. B. Smith, 1955) (Whitley's splitfin)
 Luzonichthys williamsi J. E. Randall & J. E. McCosker, 1992

References

Anthiinae